Lake Township is a civil township of Missaukee County in the U.S. state of Michigan. The population was 2,800 at the 2010 census, which makes it the county's most-populated municipality.

Communities 

Geography

Lake Township includes several large lakes, including Lake Missaukee, Crooked Lake, Lake Sapphire, and Round Lake.  The Clam River also flows through the township.

Highways
 runs mostly conterminous with M-66 before splitting off to run east–west through the southern portion of the township.
 forms most of the eastern boundary of the township.

Demographics
As of the census of 2000, there were 2,468 people, 1,005 households, and 756 families residing in the township. The racial makeup of the township was 97.61% White, 0.12% African American, 0.53% Native American, 0.49% Asian, 0.04% from other races, and 1.22% from two or more races. Hispanic or Latino of any race were 1.09% of the population.

There were 1,005 households, out of which 28.9% had children under the age of 18 living with them, 64.1% were married couples living together, 7.0% had a female householder with no husband present, and 24.7% were non-families. 20.2% of all households were made up of individuals, and 8.6% had someone living alone who was 65 years of age or older.  The average household size was 2.45 and the average family size was 2.78.

In the township the population was spread out, with 22.9% under the age of 18, 6.2% from 18 to 24, 27.3% from 25 to 44, 27.2% from 45 to 64, and 16.5% who were 65 years of age or older.  The median age was 42 years. For every 100 females, there were 98.7 males.  For every 100 females age 18 and over, there were 99.5 males.

The median income for a household in the township was $36,934, and the median income for a family was $42,059. Males had a median income of $30,339 versus $22,148 for females. The per capita income for the township was $18,332.  About 7.0% of families and 9.4% of the population were below the poverty line, including 11.3% of those under age 18 and 6.9% of those age 65 or over.

References

Townships in Missaukee County, Michigan
Townships in Michigan
Populated places established in 1883
1883 establishments in Michigan